Jun-hyeok, Joon-hyuk, or Jun-hyok is a Korean masculine given name. Its meaning differs based on the hanja used to write each syllable of the name. There are 34 hanja with the reading "joon" and nine hanja with the reading "hyuk" on the South Korean government's official list of hanja which may be registered for use in given names.

People with this name include:
Yang Joon-hyuk (born 1969), South Korean former baseball player and television personality
Lee Jun-hyeok (actor, born 1972) , South Korean actor
Lee Joon-hyuk (actor, born 1984), South Korean actor
Park Jun-hyuk (born 1987), South Korean footballer
Jeon Jun-hyeok (born 2003), South Korean actor
Kwak Jun-hyeok, South Korean political scientist

See also
List of Korean given names
Cho Jun-hyuk (born 1960), South Korean politician, whose given name is spelled Jeon-hyeok (전혁) in Revised Romanisation

References

Korean masculine given names